Niké Aréna is an arena in Žilina, Slovakia.  It is primarily used for ice hockey and is the home arena of Vlci Žilina. It has a capacity of 6,200 people and was built in 1945.

Indoor ice hockey venues in Slovakia
Buildings and structures in Žilina Region